Jorge Varela may refer to:

 Jorge Varela (environmentalist), environmentalist from Honduras
 Jorge Alcocer Varela (born 1946), Mexican immunologist and researcher
 Jorge Varela (kickboxer) (born 1994), Spanish kickboxer